is a Japanese welterweight kickboxer and karateka competing in K-1 MAX. His real name is Takayuki Kohiruimaki. He started calling himself Taishin Kohiruimaki in 2008.

Biography

Young age
Taishin Kohiruimaki was born as Takayuki Kohiruimaki in Misawa, Aomori, November 11, 1977. He started learning karate at the branch of Kyokushin kaikan, and then he started kickboxing at Active J, a kickboxing gym in Tokyo.

Early career
On January 31, 1997, he debuted as a professional kickboxer of All Japan Kickboxing Federation(AJKF), and he won his first bout by KO at 3R. On May 30, 1997, he fought and won against Masato (a future K-1 tournament champion.) Kohiruimaki won by TKO at 3R with knee strikes. On October 26, he fought against Tatsuya Suzuki who was the current champion of AJKF at welterweight, and he won by TKO at 2R. After this bout, he left AJKF because his gym, Active J, decided to leave AJKF and established J-Network, a new kickboxing organization.

K-1
On October 3, 1999, Kohiruimaki was recruited by K-1, and fought against Kotetsu Boku at the special match of K-1 World GP '99 Opening. The bout was ended as a draw after five rounds.

On August 28, 2008, he announced that he had changed his fighting name. He named himself "Taishin Kohiruimaki".

Titles
2009 K-1 World MAX Japan tournament champion
2005 K-1 World MAX Japan tournament champion
2004 K-1 World MAX Japan tournament champion
2000 ISKA World Oriental Super welterweight champion

Kickboxing record

|-
|-  bgcolor="#FFBBBB"
| 2009-10-26 || Loss ||align=left| Gago Drago || K-1 World MAX 2009 Championship Tournament Final Super Fight || Yokohama, Japan || Decision (Unanimous) || 3 || 3:00 || 40-20-2 
|-
|-  bgcolor="#CCFFCC"
| 2009-02-23 || Win ||align=left| Yuya Yamamoto || K-1 World MAX 2009 Japan Tournament Final || Tokyo, Japan || Decision (Unanimous) || 3 || 3:00 || 40-19-2
|-
! style=background:white colspan=9 |
|-
|-  bgcolor="#CCFFCC"
| 2009-02-23 || Win ||align=left| Yasuhiro Kido || K-1 World MAX 2009 Japan Tournament Semi Finals || Tokyo, Japan || TKO (Referee Stoppage) || 2 || 0:58 || 39-19-2
|-
|-  bgcolor="#CCFFCC"
| 2009-02-23 || Win ||align=left| Andy Ologun || K-1 World MAX 2009 Japan Tournament Quarter Finals || Tokyo, Japan || Decision (Majority) || 3 || 3:00 || 38-19-2
|-
|-  bgcolor="#CCFFCC"
| 2008-12-05 || Win ||align=left| Ash-Ra || A.J.K.F. Huziwara Fujiwara Festival '08 || Japan || Decision (Unanimous) || 3 || 3:00 || 37-19-2
|-
|-  bgcolor="#FFBBBB"
| 2008-10-01 || Loss ||align=left| Joerie Mes || K-1 World MAX 2008 Championship Final Super Fight || Tokyo, Japan || KO (Left Hook) || 3 || 2:59 || 36-19-2
|-
|-  bgcolor="#FFBBBB"
| 2007-10-03 || Loss ||align=left| Virgil Kalakoda || K-1 World MAX 2007 Championship Super Fight || Tokyo, Japan || TKO (Referee Stoppage) || 3 || 1:56 || 36-18-2
|-
|-  bgcolor="#CCFFCC"
| 2007-06-28 || Win ||align=left| Tsogto Amara || K-1 World MAX 2007 Tournament Final Elimination Super Fight || Tokyo, Japan || Decision (Unanimous) || 3 || 3:00 || 36-17-2
|-
|-  bgcolor="#FFBBBB"
| 2007-02-05 || Loss ||align=left| Andy Ologun || K-1 World MAX 2007 Japan Tournament Quarter Finals || Tokyo, Japan || Ext.R Decision (Unanimous) || 4 || 3:00 || 35-17-2
|-
|-  bgcolor="#FFBBBB"
| 2006-09-04 || Loss ||align=left| Andy Souwer || K-1 World MAX 2006 Champions Challenge || Tokyo, Japan || Decision (Unanimous) || 3 || 3:00 || 34-15-2
|-
|-  bgcolor="#FFBBBB"
| 2006-06-30 || Loss ||align=left| Masato || K-1 World MAX 2006 Championship Quarter Finals || Yokohama, Japan || Decision (Unanimous) || 3 || 3:00 || 35-15-2
|-
|-  bgcolor="#CCFFCC"
| 2006-04-05 || Win ||align=left| Chi Bin Lim || K-1 World MAX 2006 World Tournament Open || Tokyo, Japan || TKO (3 Knockdowns/Low Kick) || 3 || 2:46 || 35-14-2
|-
! style=background:white colspan=9 |
|-
|-  bgcolor="#FFBBBB"
| 2005-07-20 || Loss ||align=left| Andy Souwer || K-1 World MAX 2005 Championship Quarter Finals || Yokohama, Japan || Decision (Majority) || 3 || 3:00 || 34-14-2
|-
|-  bgcolor="#CCFFCC"
| 2005-05-04 || Win ||align=left| Darius Skliaudys || K-1 World MAX 2005 World Tournament Open || Tokyo, Japan || TKO (Corner Stoppage) || 2 || 1:29 || 34-13-2
|-
! style=background:white colspan=9 |
|-
|-  bgcolor="#CCFFCC"
| 2005-02-23 || Win ||align=left| Akeomi Nitta || K-1 World MAX 2005 Japan Tournament Final || Tokyo, Japan || KO (Right Front Kick) || 1 || 0:36 || 33-13-2
|-
! style=background:white colspan=9 |
|-
|-  bgcolor="#CCFFCC"
| 2005-02-23 || Win ||align=left| Kojiro || K-1 World MAX 2005 Japan Tournament Semi Finals || Tokyo, Japan || TKO (2 Knockdowns/Right Hook) || 2 || 1:13 || 32-13-2
|-
|-  bgcolor="#CCFFCC"
| 2005-02-23 || Win ||align=left| Kazuya Yasuhiro || K-1 World MAX 2005 Japan Tournament Quarter Finals || Tokyo, Japan || Ext.R Decision (Split) || 4 || 3:00 || 31-13-2
|-
|-  bgcolor="#CCFFCC"
| 2004-10-13 || Win ||align=left| Albert Kraus || K-1 World MAX 2004 Champions' Challenge || Tokyo, Japan || Decision (Unanimous) || 3 || 3:00 || 30-13-2
|-
|-  bgcolor="#FFBBBB"
| 2004-07-07 || Loss ||align=left| Buakaw Por. Pramuk || K-1 World MAX 2004 World Tournament Semi Finals || Tokyo, Japan || KO (Knee Strike) || 2 || 0:42 || 29-13-2
|-
|-  bgcolor="#CCFFCC"
| 2004-07-07 || Win ||align=left| Mike Zambidis || K-1 World MAX 2004 World Tournament Quarter Finals || Tokyo, Japan || Decision (Unanimous) || 3 || 3:00 || 29-12-2
|-
|-  bgcolor="#CCFFCC"
| 2004-04-07 || Win ||align=left| Paolo Balicha || K-1 World MAX 2004 World Tournament Open || Tokyo, Japan || Decision (Unanimous) || 3 || 3:00 || 28-12-2
|-
! style=background:white colspan=9 |
|-
|-  bgcolor="#CCFFCC"
| 2004-02-24 || Win ||align=left| Serkan Yilmaz || K-1 World MAX 2004 Japan Tournament Final || Tokyo, Japan || Decision (Unanimous) || 3 || 3:00 || 27-12-2
|-
! style=background:white colspan=9 |
|-
|-  bgcolor="#CCFFCC"
| 2004-02-24 || Win ||align=left| Kozo Takeda || K-1 World MAX 2004 Japan Tournament Semi Finals || Tokyo, Japan || KO (Flying Knee) || 2 || 1:05 || 26-12-2
|-
|-  bgcolor="#CCFFCC"
| 2004-02-24 || Win ||align=left| Hayato || K-1 World MAX 2004 Japan Tournament Quarter Finals || Tokyo, Japan || Decision (Unanimous) || 3 || 3:00 || 25-12-2
|-
|-  bgcolor="#CCFFCC"
| 2003-11-18 || Win ||align=left| Tony Valente || K-1 World MAX 2003 Champions' Challenge || Tokyo, Japan || KO (Body kick) || 3 || 0:59 || 24-12-2
|-

|-  bgcolor="#fbb"
| 2003-08-30 || Loss||align=left| Funfa Luktabfah || Future Fighter IKUSA 4 - FIREWORKS || Japan || 2nd Ext.R Decision (Majority) || 5 || 3:00 || 23-12-2
|-

|-  bgcolor="#CCFFCC"
| 2003-06-08 || Win ||align=left| Karimi Shonan || Future Fighter IKUSA 3 - Suicide Broken Arrow || Japan || Decision (Unanimous) || 3 || 3:00 || 23-11-2
|-
|-  bgcolor="#FFBBBB"
| 2003-03-01 || Loss ||align=left| Yasuhiro Kazuya || K-1 World MAX 2003 Japan Grand Prix Quarter Finals || Tokyo, Japan || Decision (Unanimous) || 3 || 3:00 || 22-11-2
|-
|-  bgcolor="#FFBBBB"
| 2002-10-11 || Loss ||align=left| Peter Crooke || K-1 World MAX 2002 Champions' Challenge || Tokyo, Japan || KO (Left Hook) || 5 || 1:06 || 22-10-2
|-
|-  bgcolor="#FFBBBB"
| 2002-05-11 || Loss ||align=left| Kaolan Kaovichit || K-1 World MAX 2002 World Tournament Final Semi Finals || Tokyo, Japan || KO (Knee Strikes) || 2 || 2:42 || 22-9-2
|-
|-  bgcolor="#CCFFCC"
| 2002-05-11 || Win ||align=left| Marino Deflorin || K-1 World MAX 2002 World Tournament Final Quarter Finals || Tokyo, Japan || KO (Left Knee) || 1 || 1:12 || 22-8-2
|-
|-  bgcolor="#FFBBBB"
| 2002-02-11 || Loss ||align=left| Masato || K-1 Japan MAX 2002 Final|| Tokyo, Japan || Decision (Unanimous) || 3 || 3:00 || 21-8-2
|-
! style=background:white colspan=9 |
|-
|-  bgcolor="#CCFFCC"
| 2002-02-11 || Win ||align=left| Takashi Ono || K-1 Japan MAX 2002 Semi Finals || Tokyo, Japan || Decision (Unanimous) || 3 || 3:00 || 21-7-2
|-
|-  bgcolor="#CCFFCC"
| 2002-02-11 || Win ||align=left| Genki Sudo || K-1 Japan MAX 2002 Quarter Finals || Tokyo, Japan || TKO (Referee Stoppage) || 3 || 1:27 || 20-7-2
|-
|-  bgcolor="#CCFFCC"
| 2001-11-11 || Win ||align=left| Ben Smullen || K-1 Oceania MAX 2001 || Melbourne, Australia || KO (Right Low Kick) || 4 || || 19-7-2
|-
|-  bgcolor="#CCFFCC"
| 2001-04-29 || Win ||align=left| Samir Berbachi || K-1 World Grand Prix 2001 in Osaka || Osaka, Japan || KO (Left Knee) || 3 || 0:24 || 18-7-2
|-
|-  bgcolor="#CCFFCC"
| 2001-03-30 || Win ||align=left| Maxim Grechkin || M.A.J.K.F. "ODYSSEY-1 Ito Takashi Retirement Memorial Match" || Tokyo, Japan || Decision (Unanimous) || 5 || 3:00 || 17-7-2
|-
|-  bgcolor="#FFBBBB"
| 2001-01-12 || Loss ||align=left| Daniel Dawson || Wolf Revolution: 2nd Wave || Japan || Decision (Majority) || 5 || 3:00 || 16-7-2  
|-
|-  bgcolor="#CCFFCC"
| 2000-12-10 || Win ||align=left| Wilreid Montargne || K-1 World Grand Prix 2000 Final || Tokyo, Japan || KO (Kick) || 5 || 1:46 || 16-6-2
|-
|-  bgcolor="#CCFFCC"
| 2000-11-01 || Win ||align=left| Neil Woods || K-1 J-MAX 2000 || Tokyo, Japan || KO (Right High Kick) || 3 || 0:47 || 15-6-2
|-
! style=background:white colspan=9 |
|-
|-  bgcolor="#CCFFCC"
| 2000-07-20 || Win ||align=left| Luke Kenton || M.A.J.K.F. "Combat 2000"  || Japan || Decision (Unanimous) || 5 || 3:00 || 14-6-2
|-
|-  bgcolor="#FFBBBB"
| 2000-06-03 || Loss ||align=left| Marino Deflorin || K-1 Fight Night 2000 || Zürich, Switzerland || Decision (Unanimous) || 5 || 3:00 || 13-6-2
|-
! style=background:white colspan=9 |
|-
|-  bgcolor="#c5d2ea"
| 2000-04-29 || Draw ||align=left| Ryuji Goto || M.A.J.K.F. || Japan || Decision Draw || 5 || 3:00 || 13-5-2
|-
|-  bgcolor="#CCFFCC"
| 2000-01-25 || Win ||align=left| Ramon Dekkers || K-1 Rising 2000 || Nagasaki, Japan || TKO (Doctor Stoppage) || 1 || 3:00 || 13-5-1
|-
|-  bgcolor="#CCFFCC"
| 1999-12-24 || Win ||align=left| Shannon Forrester || M.A.J.K.F. "Tornado Warning Tornado Invasion"  || Japan || TKO (Doctor Stoppage) || 2 || 2:26 || 12-5-1
|-
|-  bgcolor="#c5d2ea"
| 1999-10-03 || Draw ||align=left| Hideki Boku || K-1 World Grand Prix '99 Opening Round || Osaka, Japan || Decision Draw || 5 || 3:00 || 11-5-1
|-
|-  bgcolor="#FFBBBB"
| 1999-06-01 || Loss ||align=left| Kim Hoon || A.J.K.F. "WAVE-II" || Japan || Decision (Split) || 5 || 3:00 || 11-5
|-
|-  bgcolor="#FFBBBB"
| 1999-03-17 || Loss ||align=left| Chanapek Gatyindee || A.J.K.F. "WAVE-II" || Japan || KO || 3 || 2:24 || 11-4 
|-
|-  bgcolor="#CCFFCC"
| 1999-02-05 || Win ||align=left| JMTC Pittinoi || J-Network "Kick the Kick" '99 Stage 1 || Tokyo, Japan || TKO (Corner Stoppage) || 3 || 2:01 || 11-3
|-
|-  bgcolor="#FFBBBB"
| 1999-01-16 || Loss ||align=left| || Omnoi Stadium || Bangkok, Thailand || Decision (Unanimous) || 5 || 3:00 || 10-3
|-
|-  bgcolor="#CCFFCC"
| 1998-12-22 || Win ||align=left| Tomohiro Chiba || J-Network "Kick the Kick" '98 Final || Tokyo, Japan || KO (Knee Strike) || 2 || 2:56 || 10-2
|-
|-  bgcolor="#CCFFCC"
| 1998-11-14 || Win ||align=left| Hiroyuki Doi || GROUND ZERO TOKYO ~ Shoot Boxing  || Tokyo, Japan || TKO (Doctor Stoppage) || 5 || 3:00 || 9-2
|-
|-  bgcolor="#CCFFCC"
| 1998-09-26 || Win ||align=left| Karim Souda || J-Network "Kick the Kick" '98 Stage 4 || Tokyo, Japan || Decision (Unanimous) || 5 || 3:00 || 8-2
|-
|-  bgcolor="#FFBBBB"
| 1998-04-25 || Loss ||align=left| John Wayne Parr || J-Network || Tokyo, Japan || Decision (Unanimous) || 5 || 3:00 || 7-2
|-
|-  bgcolor="#CCFFCC"
| 1998-02-28 || Win ||align=left| Mark Brackenbury || J-Network "Kick the Kick" '98 Stage 1 || Tokyo, Japan || TKO (Doctor Stoppage) || 2 || 2:51 || 7-1
|-
|-  bgcolor="#CCFFCC"
| 1998-01-24 || Win ||align=left| Swat || Omnoi Stadium || Bangkok, Thailand || KO (Knees)|| 4 || || 6-1
|-
|-  bgcolor="#FFBBBB"
| 1997-12-21 || Loss ||align=left| Akeomi Nitta || J-Network "J-Prestage" || Tokyo, Japan || KO (Low Kicks) || 4 || 2:13 || 5-1
|-
|-  bgcolor="#CCFFCC"
| 1997-10-26 || Win ||align=left| Tatsuya Suzuki || A.J.K.F. || Tokyo, Japan || KO || 2 || 1:55 || 5-0
|-
|-  bgcolor="#CCFFCC"
| 1997-07-25 || Win ||align=left| Tomohiro Chiba || A.J.K.F. "Kick Over-VIII" || Tokyo, Japan || KO (Knee Strikes) || 3 || 1:47 || 4-0
|-
|-  bgcolor="#CCFFCC"
| 1997-07-12 || Win ||align=left| G Kianuanjai || Omnoi Boxing Stadium || Samut Sakhon, Thailand || KO || 3 || || 3-0
|-
|-  bgcolor="#CCFFCC"
| 1997-05-30 || Win ||align=left| Masato || A.J.K.F. "Kick Over-VI" || Tokyo, Japan || TKO (Referee Stoppage) || 3 || 2:52 || 2-0 
|-
|-  bgcolor="#CCFFCC"
| 1997-01-31 || Win ||align=left| Yuzo Shinozaki || A.J.K.F. "Kick Over-I" || Tokyo, Japan || KO || 3 || 1:54 || 1-0
|-
|-
| colspan=9 | Legend:

See also
List of K-1 events
List of male kickboxers

References

External links
Official homepage of Takayuki Kohiruimaki (in Japanese)

1977 births
Living people
People from Misawa, Aomori
Japanese male kickboxers
Welterweight kickboxers
Japanese male karateka
Kyokushin kaikan practitioners
Sportspeople from Aomori Prefecture